Joseph Germain Geefs or Jozef Germain Geefs (23 December 1808 – 9 October 1885) was a Belgian sculptor. Also his six brothers Guillaume Geefs, Aloys Geefs, Jean Geefs, Théodore Geefs, Charles Geefs and Alexandre Geefs were sculptors.

Life
Joseph Geefs was born in Antwerp, where he studied at the Royal Academy of Fine Arts, going on to École des Beaux-Arts de Paris and winning the Prix de Rome in 1836. In 1841, he became a lecturer in sculpture and anatomy at the Academy in Antwerp (his pupils included Bart van Hove and Jef Lambeaux), rising to be its director in 1876. He was made an officer of the Order of Leopold in 1859 by King Leopold I.

Geefs married a daughter of the architect Lodewijk Roelandt and probably produced the portrait medallion on his gravestone. Geefs died in Antwerp, aged 76, and was buried in Berchem.

Honours 
 1881: Grand Officer in the Order of Leopold.
 Knight Commander of the Order of the White Falcon.
 Officer in the Order of the Oak Crown.
 Officer in the Order of the Zähringer Lion.
 Knight in the Order of the Immaculate Conception of Vila Viçosa.

Selected works

Belgium

Antwerp
 Indian rider attacked by two jaguars (1869) and Hunter with booty, in Antwerp Zoo
 Equestrian statue of Leopold I of Belgium, in Leopoldstraat (1872)

Brussels
 L'ange du Mal (The Angel of Evil), Royal Museums of Fine Arts of Belgium

Mechelen
 Stations of the cross (1867) and images (1867–1871) in Saints Peter and Paul Church

Netherlands

Heiligerlee
 Monument to Adolf van Nassau (1873), to a design by Johannes Hinderikus Egenberger

Rotterdam
 Gijsbert Karel van Hogendorp (1867), Coolsingel

Tilburg
 Portrait medallion of William II of the Netherlands on an obelisk (1874)

References

External links

Rijksbureau voor Kunsthistorische Documentatie

1808 births
1885 deaths
École des Beaux-Arts alumni
19th-century Belgian sculptors
19th-century Belgian male artists
Knights of the Order of the Immaculate Conception of Vila Viçosa
People from Antwerp